United Democratic Movement "Solidarnost" (Obyedinonnoye demokraticheskoye dvizheniye «Solidarnost», ODD "Solidarnost"), abbreviated ODD "Solidarnost" (Russian for "Solidarity", named after the Polish Solidarność), is a Russian liberal democratic political movement founded on 13 December 2008 by a number of well-known members of the liberal democratic opposition, including Garry Kasparov, Boris Nemtsov, Lev Ponomaryov and others from the Yabloko and Union of Right Forces (which had just merged with two pro-Kremlin parties, the Democratic Party of Russia and Civilian Power, to form the pro-Kremlin liberal democratic Right Cause) parties, leaders of the Dissenters March events, the Committee 2008, the People's Democratic Union, the United Civil Front, The Other Russia and other politicians and political groups.

In an apparent attempt to weaken the movement immediately before its foundation, President Dmitri Medvedev nominated former leader of the Union of Right Forces Nikita Belykh to become governor of the Kirov Oblast. (Belykh agreed to take the position.) As reported by the International Herald Tribune Belykh "sought to explain his decision by arguing that he could do more good by working with the Kremlin. He said he would prove that someone with progressive ideas could succeed in the government", while saying that "When you have nothing at all, when you cannot even get close in the elections, when all your paths are being cut off, then you just can't have a political party."

History
Previously, attempts to unite the opposition were undertaken by the organizations of the Committee 2008, the United Civil Front, the Other Russia, the National Assembly of the Russian Federation, and many years of attempts to establish a dialogue between the SPS and Russian United Democratic Party "Yabloko".

Participants
Solidarnost movement includes the following forces:
Anti-war club, unifying protesters against war and torture at the Caucasus
Former members of the Union of Right Forces
Free Radicals libertarian movement (
Oborona movement
Union of solidarity with political prisoners
"For human rights" movement
other democratic and human rights organizations.
United Civil Front led by Garry Kasparov

See also
 Hungarian Solidarity Movement
 Solidarity

References

External links
 
Official party platform translation 

2008 establishments in Russia
Liberalism in Russia
Opposition to Vladimir Putin
People's Freedom Party "For Russia without Lawlessness and Corruption"
Organizations established in 2008
Political organizations based in Russia
Russian democracy movements